Amphitryon 38  is a play written in 1929 by the French dramatist Jean Giraudoux, the number in the title being Giraudoux's whimsical approximation of how many times the story had been told on stage previously.

Original productions
Amphitryon 38 was translated into English in 1938 by S. N. Behrman, in 1964 by Phyllis La Farge and Peter H. Judd, and in 1967 by Roger Gellert.

Amphitryon 38 was first performed on 8 November 1929 in Paris at the Comedie des Champs-Elysees in a production by Louis Jouvet.

An English production of Amphitryon 38, starring Alfred Lunt and Lynn Fontanne, opened at New York's Shubert Theatre on 1 November 1937.

In 1957 a BBC production included its first piece of commissioned electronic music, created by Daphne Oram.

References

External links
 

Plays by Jean Giraudoux
1929 plays
Plays based on classical mythology
Plays based on works by Plautus